Tread mark may refer to:

 Skid mark, a mark left by the skidding of an object, often a tire
 Tread Marks, a tank combat computer game
 TreadMarks, distributed shared computer memory system

See also
 Footprint